PSLV-C34 was the 36th mission of the PSLV (Polar Satellite Launch Vehicle) program and 14th mission of PSLV in XL configuration. The PSLV-C34 successfully carried and deployed 20 satellites in the Sun-synchronous orbit. The PSLV-C34 carried One Cartosat-2 satellite, SathyabamaSat (satellite from Sathyabama University, Chennai), Swayam (satellite from College of Engineering, Pune) & 17 other satellites from United States, Canada, Germany & Indonesia.

Mission parameters
 Mass:
 Total liftoff weight: 
 Payload weight: 
 Overall height: 
 Propellant:
 Stage 1: Solid HTPB based
 Stage 2: Liquid UH 25 + 
 Stage 3: Solid HTPB based
 Stage 4: Liquid MMH + MON-3
 Altitude: 
 Maximum velocity:  (recorded at time of Cartosat-2 separation)
 Inclination: 97.48°
 Period: 26 minutes 30 seconds
Source:

Launch
PSLV-C34 was launched from Satish Dhawan Space Centre at 09:26 IST on 22 June 2016. The PSLV carried total 20 satellites including the primary payload Cartosat-2C. Cartosat-2C was placed in low Earth orbit at 9:44 IST. The entire mission lasted 26 minutes and 30 seconds. The PSLV-C34 is a more advanced, expendable version of the rocket used to launch the Indian Mars Orbiter in 2014.

Mission milestones
The mission marked:
36th flight of Polar Satellite Launch Vehicle.
14th flight of Polar Satellite Launch Vehicle in XL configuration. 
Record number of satellites carried on a single flight by ISRO.
Sources:

Record launch
On 28 April 2008, by placing 10 satellites on PSLV-C9 (PSLV-CA), Indian Space Research Organisation created a world record for the highest number of satellites launched in a single mission. This record was broken by NASA in 2013 (by launching 29 satellites) and was further improved by ISRO when they launched 104 satellites. PSLV-C34 launch was the biggest launch (in terms of number of satellites) by ISRO until PSLV-C37.

Payload
PSLV-C34 carried and deployed total 20 satellites. Following are the details of the payload.

See also
 Indian Space Research Organisation
 Polar Satellite Launch Vehicle

References 

Spacecraft launched by India in 2016
Polar Satellite Launch Vehicle